Kolonka is a rural locality (a village) in Shafranovsky Selsoviet, Alsheyevsky District, Bashkortostan, Russia. The population was 3 as of 2010. There is 1 street.

Geography 
Kolonka is located 26 km west of Rayevsky (the district's administrative centre) by road. Karan is the nearest rural locality.

References 

Rural localities in Alsheyevsky District